Microsoft is an American public multinational corporation headquartered in Redmond, Washington, USA that develops, manufactures, licenses, and supports a wide range of products and services predominantly related to computing through its various product divisions. Established on April 4, 1975, to develop and sell BASIC interpreters for the Altair 8800, Microsoft rose to dominate the home computer operating system market with MS-DOS in the mid-1980s, followed by the Microsoft Windows line of operating systems. Microsoft would also come to dominate the office suite market with Microsoft Office. The company has diversified in recent years into the video game industry with the Xbox, the Xbox 360, the Xbox One, and the Xbox Series X as well as into the consumer electronics and digital services market with Zune, MSN and the Windows Phone OS.

The company's initial public offering was held on March 14, 1986. The stock, which eventually closed at US$27.75 a share, peaked at $29.25 a share shortly after the market opened for trading. After the offering, Microsoft had a market capitalization of $519.777 million. Microsoft has subsequently acquired over 225 companies, purchased stakes in 64 companies, and made 25 divestments. Of the companies that Microsoft has acquired, 107 were based in the United States. Microsoft has not released financial details for most of these mergers and acquisitions.

Since Microsoft's first acquisition in 1986, it has purchased an average of six companies a year. The company purchased more than ten companies a year between 2005 and 2008, and it acquired 18 firms in 2006, the most in a single year, including Onfolio, Lionhead Studios, Massive Incorporated, ProClarity, Winternals Software, and Colloquis. Microsoft has made fourteen acquisitions worth over one billion dollars: Skype (2011), aQuantive (2007), Fast Search & Transfer (2008), Navision (2002), Visio Corporation (2000), Yammer (2012), Nokia's mobile and devices division (2013), Mojang (2014), LinkedIn (2016), GitHub (2018), Affirmed Networks (2020), ZeniMax Media (2020), Nuance Communications (2021), and Activision Blizzard (2022).

Microsoft has also purchased several stakes valued at more than a billion dollars. It obtained an 11.5% stake in Comcast for $1 billion, a 22.98% stake in Telewest for $2.263 billion, and a 3% stake in AT&T for $5 billion. Among Microsoft's divestments, in which parts of the company are sold to another company, only Expedia Group was sold for more than a billion dollars; USA Networks purchased the company on February 5, 2002, for $1.372 billion.

Key acquisitions
One of Microsoft's first acquisitions was Forethought on July 30, 1987. Forethought was founded in 1983 and developed a presentation program that would later be known as Microsoft PowerPoint.

On December 31, 1997, Microsoft acquired Hotmail.com for $500 million, its largest acquisition at the time, and integrated Hotmail into its MSN group of services. Hotmail, a free webmail service founded in 1996 by Jack Smith and Sabeer Bhatia, had more than 8.5 million subscribers earlier that month.

Microsoft acquired Seattle-based Visio Corporation on January 7, 2000, for $1.375 billion. Visio, a software company, was founded in 1990 as Axon Corporation, and had its initial public offering in November 1995. The company developed the diagramming application software, Visio, which was integrated into Microsoft's product line as Microsoft Visio after its acquisition.

On July 12, 2002, Microsoft purchased Navision for $1.33 billion. The company, which developed the technology for the Microsoft Dynamics NAV enterprise resource planning software, was integrated into Microsoft as a new division named Microsoft Business Solutions, later renamed to Microsoft Dynamics.

Microsoft purchased aQuantive, an advertising company, on August 13, 2007, for $6.333 billion. Before the acquisition, aQuantive was ranked 14th in terms of revenue among advertising agencies worldwide. aQuantive had three subsidiaries at the time of the acquisition: Avenue A/Razorfish, one of the world's largest digital agencies, Atlas Solutions, and DRIVE Performance Solutions. Microsoft acquired the Norwegian enterprise search company Fast Search & Transfer on April 25, 2008, for $1.191 billion to boost its search technology.

On May 10, 2011, Microsoft announced its acquisition of Skype Technologies, creator of the VoIP service Skype, for $8.5 billion. With a value 32 times larger than Skype's operating profits, the deal was Microsoft's largest acquisition at the time. Skype would become a division within Microsoft, with Skype's former CEO Tony Bates —then the division's first president —reporting to the CEO of Microsoft.

On September 2, 2013, Microsoft announced its intent to acquire the mobile hardware division of Nokia (which had established a long-term partnership with Microsoft to produce smartphones built off its Windows Phone platform) in a deal worth 3.79 billion euros, along with another 1.65 billion to license Nokia's portfolio of patents. Steve Ballmer considered the purchase to be a "bold step into the future" for both companies, primarily as a result of its recent collaborations. The acquisition, scheduled to close in early 2014 pending regulatory approval, did not include the Here mapping service or the infrastructure division Nokia Solutions and Networks, which will be retained by Nokia. While the deal went through, in May 2016 Microsoft abandoned its mobile business and sold the Nokia feature phone line.

In September 2014, Microsoft purchased Mojang for $2.5 billion.

On June 13, 2016, Microsoft announced it planned to acquire the professional networking site LinkedIn for $26.2 billion, to be completed by the end of 2016. The acquisition would keep LinkedIn as a distinct brand and retain its current CEO, Jeff Weiner, who will subsequently report to Microsoft CEO Satya Nadella. The acquisition was completed on December 8, 2016.

On June 4, 2018, Microsoft acquired the popular code repository site GitHub for $7.5 billion in Microsoft stock.

On September 21, 2020, Microsoft announced its intent to acquire Zenimax Media and all its subsidiaries for $7.5 billion.
The acquisition was complete in March 9, 2021

On January 18, 2022, Microsoft announced its intent to acquire Activision Blizzard, an American video game holding company, for $68.7 billion in cash.The deal has been approved by both companies' board of directors and is expected to close in 2023 following international government regulatory review of the action.

On March 9, 2022, Microsoft acquired Bethesda Softworks for a total of $7.5 billion, but Sony kept the rights for their respective Bethesda games.

Stakes

Divestitures

See also 
 List of largest mergers and acquisitions
 Lists of corporate acquisitions and mergers

Notes

References

Sources

External links 
 
 Microsoft Investor Relations – Acquisitions
 Infographic of Microsoft's vast legacy of acquisition | Techi.com
 Dashboard and analysis of all Microsoft acquisitions

Microsoft

Mergers and acquisitions